Anne Riemersma (born 1954) is a Dutch road and track racing cyclist. She was a three times silver medal winner in the individual pursuit at the UCI Track Cycling World Championships, in 1977, 1978 and 1979. She became national track cycling champion in the individual pursuit and the omnium in 1978.

She married Gerrit Möhlmann and changed her last name to Anne Möhlmann. Her husband, sons Pleuni Möhlmann and Peter Möhlmann, and son-in-law Fulco Van Gulik were also professional cyclists.

References

1954 births
Living people
Dutch female cyclists
People from Menaldumadeel
Cyclists from Friesland
Dutch track cyclists
21st-century Dutch women
20th-century Dutch women
20th-century Dutch people